Southern Buskerud Police District is one of 27 police districts in Norway, covering the southern part of Buskerud and northern Vestfold. The district is headquartered in Drammen and consists of two police stations, at Drammen and Kongsberg, and eight sheriff's offices. The district is led by Chief of Police Johan Brekke. Specifically the police district covers the municipalities of Drammen, Kongsberg, Øvre Eiker, Nedre Eiker, Lier, Røyken, Hurum, Flesberg, Rollag in Buskerud and Svelvik and Sande in Vestfold. As of 2011 the district had 455 employees. The police district was created in 2003 as a merger between the former Drammen Police District and Kongsberg Police District.

References

Police districts in Norway
Organisations based in Drammen
2003 establishments in Norway
Government agencies established in 2003
Drammen